Jerricho is a given name and surname. Notable people with the name include:

 Jerricho Cotchery (born 1982), American football wide receiver
 Paul Jerricho (born 1948), British actor

See also
 Jericho (disambiguation)
 Jericó (disambiguation)